Computer Applications and Quantitative Methods in Archaeology (CAA) is a global organization bringing together archaeologists, mathematicians and computer scientists. Its aims are to encourage communication between these disciplines, to provide a survey of present work in the field, and to stimulate discussion and future progress. CAA International has been organizing the annual meetings of its members since the 1970s. It has grown into a large community of more than 1000 scholars from around the world. Its members created a dozen of National CAA chapters and special interest groups. CAA International publishes annual proceedings  and the Journal of Computer Applications in Archaeology (JCAA).

History of CAA International 

Computer Applications and Quantitative Methods in Archaeology (CAA) has been created in the 1970s. Initially, it was a small group of archaeologists and mathematicians interested in computer applications and working in the United Kingdom (UK). The first conference was organized in 1973 in Birmingham, England. In 1992 the first, CAA conference was held outside the UK. Gradually, the CAA has grown into a large international community.

Over the years national chapters have been established. Some having their own workshops series. One of the oldest chapters is in Germany
 founded in 1981. CAA Germany has annual meetings since 2010 including joint chapter meetings with Netherlands and Flanders. Germany also hosted the international conference in 2018.

Current CAA International conference 

The current 50th CAA International conference is CAA 2023 Amsterdam 50 years of synergy

Previous conferences 

 The 49th - CAA 2022: ‘iNside Formation’, Oxford, United Kingdom  
 The 48th - CAA 2021: ‘Digital Crossroads’, Virtual Conference from Limassol, Cyprus
 The 48th - CAA 2020: Oxford, UK (Postponed to 2022 due to COVID-19 pandemic)
 The 47th - CAA 2019: ‘Check Object Integrity’, Kraków, Poland
 The 46th - CAA 2018: ‘Human History and Digital Future’, Tübingen, Germany
 The 45th - CAA 2017: ‘Digital Archaeologies, Material Worlds (Past and Present)’, Atlanta, Georgia, United States 
 The 44th - CAA 2016: ‘Exploring Oceans of Data’, Oslo, Norway 
 The 43rd - CAA 2015: ‘Keep the Revolution Going’, Siena, Italy

Next conference 

 The 51st - CAA 2024: Auckland, New Zealand

References 

Computer science conferences